M Harunur Rashid (1925 – 10 October 2010) was a Bangladeshi archaeologist, educationist and museum curator, who excavated archaeological sites in Pakistan and Bangladesh.

Education
Rashid passed the matriculation in 1940 from Abu Torab High School in Chittagong and then passed IA in 1942 from Dhaka College. He obtained Bachelor of Arts (Honors) in 1945 and Master of Arts in history in 1946 from the University of Dhaka. He earned his PhD from Cambridge University in 1968.

Career
Rashid joined Bhairab College as a lecturer in History and then he moved to join the Archaeology of Pakistan. He worked as a curator at Lahore Museum and later joined the Taxila Museum. Along with British archaeologist Mortimer Wheeler, he excavated Banbhore, Taxila, Harappa-Mohenjo-daro and many other sites of Pakistan.  These excavations along with "...the principal finds of all classes formed the necessary foundation..." of Early South-East Bengal History between 6th and 13th centuries A.D.

After 1971 Rashid started working as a senior official in the Directorate of Archaeology until 1982. He also compiled and edited the volume on Bangladesh Archaeology in 1979.

He worked as a visiting professor at the Department of History, Jahangirnagar University in Savar. He also taught at the Institute of Fine Arts and History Department of the University of Dhaka.

References

1925 births
2010 deaths
Bangladeshi archaeologists
Dhaka College alumni
Academic staff of the University of Dhaka
University of Dhaka alumni
Alumni of the University of Cambridge
Academic staff of Jahangirnagar University
People from Brahmanbaria district